"That's a Man" is a song written by Mark D. Sanders, Ed Hill, and Steven Dale Jones and recorded by American country music singer Jack Ingram. It was released in October 2008 as the first single to Ingram’s album Big Dreams & High Hopes. The song is Ingram's sixth Top 40 entry on the Billboard country charts.

Content
"That's a Man" is a mid-tempo mostly accompanied by electric guitar and pedal steel guitar. In it, the narrator describes three different men, citing each as an example of men that are committed to their lives and peers. The first verse focuses on a nineteen-year-old who works two jobs to raise a family; the second tells of two Marines who become friends while in combat until one of them is killed; and an old farmer who is trying to maintain his family's farm is described in the third.

Critical reception
Matt Bjorke of Roughstock gave the song a favorable review. He compared the song to Lee Roy Parnell's "roots-y country rock anthems about the common folks" such as 1993's "On the Road", adding " There’s a place on country radio for songs like “That’s A Man” and Ingram should be the man to take it." Jasper Jones of 411 Mania gave the song two-and-a-half out of five, saying that the song had a worthy concept but awkward lyrics.

Chart performance

References

2008 singles
2008 songs
Jack Ingram songs
Songs written by Ed Hill
Songs written by Steven Dale Jones
Songs written by Mark D. Sanders
Big Machine Records singles
Song recordings produced by Jeremy Stover